B.B. is the second studio album of French singer and actress Brigitte Bardot and was released in 1964.

Track listing
 Moi Je Joue	
 Une Histoire De Plage	
 Ça Pourrait Changer	
 À La Fin De L'Été	
 Ne Me Laisse Pas L'Aimer	
 Maria Ninguem
 Je Danse Donc Je Suis	
 Mélanie	
 Ciel De Lit	
 Un Jour Comme Un Autre	
 Les Cheveux Dans Le Vent	
 Jamais Trois Sans Quatre

References

1964 albums
Brigitte Bardot albums
French-language albums